The 2018 European Darts Trophy was the thirteenth of thirteen PDC European Tour events on the 2018 PDC Pro Tour. The tournament took place at the Lokhalle, Göttingen, Germany from 12–14 October 2018. It featured a field of 48 players and £135,000 in prize money, with £25,000 going to the winner.

Michael van Gerwen was the defending champion after defeating Rob Cross 6–4 in 2017's final.

Van Gerwen won his third consecutive European Darts Trophy title and his 28th European Tour title in total after an 8–3 win over James Wade in the final.

Prize money
This is how the prize money is divided:

Prize money will count towards the PDC Order of Merit, the ProTour Order of Merit and the European Tour Order of Merit, with one exception: should a seeded player lose in the second round (last 32), their prize money will not count towards any Orders of Merit, although they still receive the full prize money payment.

Qualification and format
The top 16 entrants from the PDC ProTour Order of Merit on 12 September will automatically qualify for the event and will be seeded in the second round.

The remaining 32 places will go to players from five qualifying events – 18 from the UK Qualifier (held in Dublin on 27 September), eight from the West/South European Qualifier (held on 13 September), four from the Host Nation Qualifier (held on 11 October), one from the Nordic & Baltic Qualifier (held on 11 August) and one from the East European Qualifier (held on 26 August).

Mensur Suljović and Adrian Lewis, who would have been the number 6 and 7 seeds respectively, withdrew from the tournament prior to the draw. Mervyn King and Stephen Bunting, the highest-ranked qualifiers, were promoted to 15th and 16th seed respectively, which meant an extra two places were made available in the Host Nation Qualifier.

The following players took part in the tournament:

Top 16
  Michael van Gerwen (champion)
  Peter Wright (second round)
  Rob Cross (quarter-finals)
  Ian White (second round)
  Michael Smith (semi-finals)
  James Wade (runner-up)
  Jonny Clayton (third round)
  Joe Cullen (second round)
  Daryl Gurney (quarter-finals)
  Simon Whitlock (second round)
  Darren Webster (third round)
  Gerwyn Price (second round)
  Dave Chisnall (quarter-finals)
  Max Hopp (third round)
  Mervyn King (second round)
  Stephen Bunting (third round)

UK Qualifier
  Mark Wilson (first round)
  Steve West (first round)
  John Henderson (third round)
  Ricky Evans (second round)
  Luke Humphries (second round)
  Matthew Edgar (third round)
  Steve Beaton (third round)
  Keegan Brown (first round)
  Luke Woodhouse (first round)
  Mickey Mansell (second round)
  Andrew Gilding (first round)
  George Killington (first round)
  Richard North (semi-finals)
  Ryan Joyce (second round)
  Brendan Dolan (first round)
  Simon Stevenson (first round)

West/South European Qualifier
  Jeffrey de Zwaan (second round)
  Jelle Klaasen (quarter-finals)
  Toni Alcinas (second round)
  Vincent van der Voort (second round)
  Jeffrey de Graaf (first round)
  Danny Noppert (first round)
  Jermaine Wattimena (first round)
  Kim Huybrechts (first round)

Host Nation Qualifier
  Martin Schindler (third round)
  Maik Langendorf (first round)
  Steffen Siepmann (first round)
  Christian Bunse (first round)
  Robert Marijanović (first round)
  Gabriel Clemens (second round)

Nordic & Baltic Qualifier
  Marko Kantele (second round)

East European Qualifier
  Krzysztof Ratajski (second round)

Draw

References

2018 PDC European Tour
2018 in German sport
October 2018 sports events in Germany
Göttingen